National Route 354 is a national highway of Japan connecting Takasaki, Gunma and Hokota, Ibaraki in Japan, with a total length of 172.8 km (107.37 mi).

References

National highways in Japan
Roads in Gunma Prefecture
Roads in Ibaraki Prefecture
Roads in Saitama Prefecture